William Pratt (1874 – after 1902) was an English professional footballer who played for Small Heath as a left back. Born in Birmingham, he was a powerful defender whose career was ended prematurely through injury. He made 139 appearances in all competitions for Small Heath without scoring a goal.

Honours
Football League Second Division runners-up: 1900–01

References

1874 births
Year of death missing
Footballers from Birmingham, West Midlands
English footballers
Association football fullbacks
Birmingham City F.C. players
Place of death missing